Thomas Charles Berryhill (August 27, 1953 – August 29, 2020) was an American Republican politician. He was a member of the Stanislaus County Board of Supervisors from January 7, 2019 until his death.  He previously represented the 8th district in the California State Senate from December 6, 2010 to November 30, 2018.  He had also served in the California State Assembly, representing the 25th district from December 4, 2006 to November 30, 2010.

After graduating from Ceres High School, Berryhill attended California Polytechnic State University, San Luis Obispo.

Berryhill's brother, Bill, represented the 26th district in the State Assembly from 2008 to 2012.  Their father, Clare, served in the State Assembly from 1969 to 1970 and the State Senate from 1972 to 1976.

Berryhill was diagnosed with Parkinson's disease in 2018.

References

External links
Join California Tom Berryhill

1953 births
2020 deaths
Farmers from California
California Polytechnic State University alumni
Republican Party members of the California State Assembly
People from Ceres, California
People from Modesto, California
21st-century American politicians
Republican Party California state senators